Carex hypsipedos is a tussock-forming species of perennial sedge in the family Cyperaceae. It is native to Peru.

See also
List of Carex species

References

hypsipedos
Plants described in 1906
Taxa named by Charles Baron Clarke
Flora of Peru